Botanic gardens in Trinidad and Tobago have collections consisting entirely of Trinidad and Tobago native and endemic species; most have a collection that include plants from around the world. There are botanical gardens and arboreta in all states and territories of Trinidad and Tobago, most are administered by local governments, some are privately owned.

 Scarborough Botanic Gardens – Tobago
 Royal Botanic Gardens, Trinidad – Port of Spain, Trinidad

References 

Trinidad and Tobago
Botanical gardens